Peter Garden (born Karl-Heinz Rothmayer; 1924–2015) was a popular German stage, television, film actor and singer, whose career ended abruptly in 1970 when it was revealed by some of his victims that he had worked in 1944 as a paid Gestapo informant in Salzburg, Austria.

Garden, under his birth name Rothmayer, had already been investigated by a Berlin, Germany, state prosecutor between 1967 and 1970 for aiding and abetting murder, because two people he had denounced to the Gestapo had been sentenced to death, and executed. The prosecutor closed the case without taking further action.

Selected filmography
 The False Adam (1955)
 Ball at the Savoy (1955)
 My Leopold (1955)
 How Do I Become a Film Star? (1955)
 Fruit in the Neighbour's Garden (1956)
 I'll See You at Lake Constance (1956)
 Hugo, the Woman Chaser  (1969)

References

Bibliography
 Cowie, Peter. Variety International Film Guide 1970. Tantivy Press, 1969.

External links

1924 births
2015 deaths
Male actors from Munich
German male television actors
German male film actors
German male stage actors
Gestapo personnel